Ermis Selimaj (born 25 May 2004) is an Albanian professional footballer who plays as a left-back for Greek Super League 2 club PAOK B.

References

2004 births
Living people
Albanian footballers
Super League Greece 2 players
PAOK FC players
PAOK FC B players
Association football defenders
Footballers from Athens